Whispering Smith Hits London is a 1952 British mystery film directed by Francis Searle and starring Richard Carlson, Greta Gynt and Herbert Lom. It was made at Bray Studios with some location shooting in London. It was released in the United States by RKO Pictures as Whispering Smith vs. Scotland Yard.

Synopsis
The screenplay concerns an American detective who is summoned to London to investigate a death in suspicious circumstances.

Cast
 Richard Carlson as Whispering Smith
 Greta Gynt as Louise
 Herbert Lom as Roger Ford
 Rona Anderson as Anne
 Alan Wheatley as Hector Reith
 Dora Bryan as Miss La Fosse
 Reginald Beckwith as Manson
 Daniel Wherry as Dr. Taren
 Michael Ward as Photographer
 Danny Green as Cecil Fleming
 James Raglan as Supt. Meaker
 Stuart Nichol as Martin
 Laurence Naismith as Parker
 Christine Silver as Mrs. Penston
 Vic Wise as Maxie

References

Bibliography
 Clinton, Franz Anthony. British Thrillers, 1950-1979: 845 Films of Suspense, Mystery, Murder and Espionage. McFarland, 2020.

External links

1952 films
1950s mystery films
British mystery films
Films directed by Francis Searle
Films set in London
British detective films
Hammer Film Productions films
British black-and-white films
1950s English-language films
1950s British films